Kendriya Vidyalaya Kollam or KV Kollam is a central government owned Kendriya Vidyalaya school in Kollam. The school is located at Ramankulangara in the city. The school has set up in the year 2007 at Mulangadakam. KV Kollam was officially inaugurated on 6 August 2007 by P. Rajendran, the then MP of Kollam.  .

History
KV kollam was started in the year 2007 as per the sanction accorded by the Govt. of India in special focus district which have no Kendriya Vidyalaya and is inaugurated at Ramankulangara in the city by P. Rajendran, the then MP from Kollam Lok Sabha constituency, on 6 August 2007. In 2010, Kollam city Corporation has acquired four acres of private land at Ramankulangara in the city at a cost of Rs.1.35 crore for the school to have its own complex. On 31 May 2018, the School shifted to its new building at Ramankulangara. In 2015, a new Kendriya Vidyalaya has been allotted for the district of Kollam at Kottarakara.

Location

The nearest major transport hubs:
Nearest Bus Stations: Kollam KSRTC Bus Station (2.9 km), Andamukkam City Bus Stand (3.8 km) and Tangasseri Bus Terminal (2.5 km)
Nearest Railway Station: Kollam Junction (4.1 km)
Nearest Sea Port: Kollam Port (2.9 km)
Nearest Airport: Kollam Helipad (Old Airport) (3 km) and Trivandrum International Airport (69.6 km)

Facilities
 Class rooms (36)
 Computer Lab (3)
 Chemistry Lab
 Physics Lab
 Library
 Jr. Science Lab
 Staff Common Room

See also

 Kollam
 Mulamkadakam
 Chinmaya Vidyalaya, Kollam
 Ramankulangara
 List of Kendriya Vidyalayas

References

Kendriya Vidyalayas in Kerala
Schools in Kollam
2007 establishments in Kerala